Gonchary is a rural locality (a khutor) in Goncharovskoye Rural Settlement, Pallasovsky District, Volgograd Oblast, Russia. The population was 129 as of 2010. There are 2 streets.

Geography 
Gonchary is located 60 km southwest of Pallasovka (the district's administrative centre) by road. Zolotari is the nearest rural locality.

References 

Rural localities in Pallasovsky District